Vamanan is an Indian writer, journalist, documentary film-maker and film music historian based in Chennai. He is known for his documentation of the lives of Tamil film music composers, singing stars and playback singers. Vamanan was awarded the Tamil Nadu government's Kalaimamani award (2005) by Chief Minister Jayalalithaa for his contribution to Tamil film history and won the first prize of the Government of Tamil Nadu Tamil development department for the first volume of Thirai Isai Alaigal (2000).

Career
Vamanan worked in newspapers including The Hindu, The Indian Express and India Today in the editorial. He was film critic of The Indian Express in the eighties. His first book was Thirai Isai Alaigal. Subsequently, four more volumes of Thirai Isai Alaigal have been released. His biography of singer T. M. Soundararajan titled "TMS - Oru pann-pattu charithiram" traces the Soundararajan's life while exploring more than thirty years of film world history. His work Mellisai Mannargal Paattu Payanam is on the work of  Viswanathan–Ramamoorthy (a duo consisting of M. S. Viswanathan and T. K. Ramamoorthy) in their individual capacities. The book was released by Justice S. Mohan and the first copy was received by film producer M. Saravanan.

Selected bibliography

References

External links 
 PBS - A singer who sang praise of his peers
 MSV - The world was his music
 When politics propelled star power
 Susheela - Singing voice that made beauty permanent

Journalists from Tamil Nadu
Music historians
Indian film historians